The 2019 BB&T Atlanta Open was a professional men's tennis tournament to be played on hard courts. It was the 32nd edition of the tournament, and part of the 2019 ATP Tour. It took place at Atlantic Station in Atlanta, United States between July 22 and 29, 2019. It was the first men's event of the 2019 US Open Series. Third-seeded Alex de Minaur won the singles title.

ATP singles main-draw entrants

Seeds 

 1 Rankings are as of July 15, 2019

Other entrants 
The following players received wildcards into the singles main draw:
  Grigor Dimitrov
  Cole Gromley
  Jack Sock

The following players received entry from the qualifying draw:
  Jason Jung 
  Kevin King
  Kwon Soon-woo 
  Kamil Majchrzak

Withdrawals 
Before the tournament
  Félix Auger-Aliassime → replaced by  Alexander Bublik
  Hubert Hurkacz → replaced by  Prajnesh Gunneswaran
  John Millman → replaced by  Bradley Klahn
  Diego Schwartzman → replaced by  Bernard Tomic

ATP doubles main-draw entrants

Seeds 

 Rankings are as of July 15, 2019

Other entrants 
The following pairs received wildcards into the doubles main draw:
 Christopher Eubanks /  Donald Young
 Nick Kyrgios /  Tommy Paul

Finals

Singles 

  Alex de Minaur defeated  Taylor Fritz, 6–3, 7–6(7–2)

Doubles 

 Dominic Inglot /  Austin Krajicek defeated  Bob Bryan /  Mike Bryan, 6–4, 6–7(5–7), [11–9]

References

External links 
 

2019 ATP Tour
2019
2019 in American tennis
2019 in sports in Georgia (U.S. state)
July 2019 sports events in the United States
2019 in Atlanta